Amy Marjorie Dale,  (15 January 1901 – 4 February 1967), published as A. M. Dale, was a British classicist and academic.

Life

Dale was born in 1901. She studied Classics as an undergraduate at Somerville College, Oxford. She subsequently studied under Ludwig Radermacher at the University of Vienna, and at the University of Lund under Albert Wifstrand. Her first academic post, from 1927 to 1929, was at Westfield College in the University of London, followed by a further post at Lady Margaret Hall, Oxford.

During the Second World War, Dale worked in the Foreign Office, and worked in her spare time on translating Eduard Fraenkel's edition of Aeschylus's Agamemnon into English. In 1944 she married T. B. L. Webster, who was employed in the same department of the Foreign Office. After the war, she moved with him to Manchester, where he was Professor of Greek. When he was appointed Professor of Greek at University College, London, she was offered and accepted a lectureship at Birkbeck College, London. In 1952 she was appointed Reader in Classics, and in 1957 a Fellow of the British Academy. In 1959, she received the honour of a Personal Chair in Greek. In 1962 she was made an Honorary Fellow of Somerville College, Oxford. She retired in 1963, becoming Professor Emeritus in Greek at the University of London.

She died in London in 1967.

The focus of Dale's research was on Greek Tragedy, especially on Euripides and the metre of Greek tragedy's choral songs and lyric parts, an area in which her work remains influential.

Selected publications

 The Lyric Metres of Greek Drama. Cambridge 1948; second edition 1968.
 Euripides, Alcestis. Edited with introduction and commentary. Oxford 1954.
 Words, Music, and Dance. Inaugural Lecture at Birkbeck College. London 1960.
 Euripides, Helen. Edited with introduction and commentary. Oxford 1967.
 Collected Papers. Edited by T. B. L. Webster and E. G. Turner. Cambridge 1969, (Available online) – Published posthumously, including some previously unpublished work.
 Metrical Analyses of tragic choruses I–III. London 1971–1983 (vol. 1, BICS Suppl. XXI,1, London 1971; vol. 2 BICS Suppl. XXI,2, London 1981; vol. 3 BICS Suppl. XXI,3, London 1983) – Published posthumously.

A full list may be found in the Bibliography in Dale's Collected Papers (listed above).

References

Sources
 R. P. Winnington-Ingram: Amy Marjorie Dale 1902–1967, in: Proceedings of the British Academy 53, 1967, 423–436, (online). – A detailed assessment of her life and work.
 Eric Gardner Turner: Miss A. M. Dale (Obituary notice from The Times, 7 February 1967), in: Collected Papers. Edited by T. B. L. Webster and E. G. Turner. Cambridge 1969 (siehe unten), IX-X, (online).
 William M. Calder III, D. J. Kramer: An Introductory Bibliography of Classical Scholarship Chiefly in the XIXth and XXth Centuries. Hildesheim-Zürich-New York 1992, 142 Anm. 1109; 336 Anm. 2567.

External links 
 Entry in Aristarchus: Catalogus Philologorum Classicorum (Project by Franco Montanari, Universität Genua)
 Entry at the website of the British Academy
 Roll of Honour, Bletchley Park

Scholars of ancient Greek literature
Alumni of Lady Margaret Hall, Oxford
Alumni of Somerville College, Oxford
Academics of Westfield College
Academics of Birkbeck, University of London
1901 births
1967 deaths
Fellows of the British Academy